Whittier may refer to:

Places
Whittier, Alaska
Whittier Airport
Whittier, California, named for John Greenleaf Whittier
Whittier College, a private liberal arts college
 Whittier Law School
Whittier High School
Whittier Hills, a local name for the western end of the Puente Hills
Whittier Narrows, a water gap between the Puente Hills and the Montebello Hills
Whittier, Denver, a neighborhood in Denver, Colorado
Whittier, Iowa
Whittier, Minneapolis, a neighborhood in Minneapolis, Minnesota
Whittier, North Carolina

People with the surname
Charles A. Whittier (1840–1908), American Civil War Union brevet brigadier general
Edward N. Whittier (1840–1902), American soldier
John Greenleaf Whittier (1807–1892), American poet and abolitionist
Max Whittier (1867–1928), American real estate developer
Nancy Whittier (born 1966), sociologist
Pauline Whittier (1876–1946), American golfer
Sumner G. Whittier (1911–2010), American politician from Massachusetts

Fictional characters
Whittier Smith, main protagonist of the film Bring It On Again, played by Anne Judson-Yager
Pollyanna Whittier, title character of Eleanor H. Porter's novel Pollyanna (1913)

Other uses
The Whittier, a high rise residential complex and former hotel in Detroit, Michigan
Whittier (Pacific Electric), a former train route in California
Whittier Fire, a 2017 wildfire in Santa Barbara County, California
Whittier Boulevard, a street in Los Angeles, California
Whittier (horse), an Australian Thoroughbred race horse

See also
Mount Whittier (disambiguation)
Whittier House (disambiguation)